Sérgio Cerqueira Barcelos (4 October 1943 – 8 February 2022) was a Brazilian politician. A member of the Democrats, he served in the Chamber of Deputies from 1991 to 2003. He died in João Pessoa on 8 February 2022, at the age of 78.

References

1943 births
2022 deaths
Democrats (Brazil) politicians
Members of the Chamber of Deputies (Brazil)
Members of the Chamber of Deputies (Brazil) from Amapá
Federal University of Rio de Janeiro alumni
20th-century Brazilian politicians
Politicians from Rio de Janeiro (city)